Dorfman is a surname. Notable people with the surname include:

 Allen Dorfman, Teamsters official
 Ariel Dorfman, Chilean-American writer
 Barnaby Dorfman, founder of Foodista.com, company director, executive film producer and inventor
 Boris Dorfman (Boruch Dorfman), Ukrainian-Jewish public figure, writer and scholar
 Dan Dorfman, newspaper columnist and former CNBC commentator
 David Dorfman (disambiguation), multiple people, including:
 David Dorfman (born 1993), American attorney and retired actor
 David Dorfman (choreographer) (born 1955), American dancer, choreographer, musician, activist and teacher
 David S. Dorfman, American screenwriter
 Donald Dorfman, American psychologist
 Elena Dorfman, American fine art photographer
 Elsa Dorfman, portrait photographer
 Harvey Dorfman (1935–2011), American mental skills coach
  (1898–1974), Soviet physicist
 Irvin Dorfman, amateur American tennis player in the 1940s and 1950s
 Irwin Dorfman, Canadian lawyer and president of the Canadian Bar Association, 1975-1976 
 Joaquin Dorfman, American writer.
 Josif Dorfman, Ukrainian-French chess grandmaster
 Michael Dorfman, Russian-Israeli author and journalist
 Michel Dorfman, leader of Breslover Hasidim
 Ralph Dorfman (1911–1985), American bio-chemist, former president of Syntex research division
 Rodrigo Dorfman, photographer, writer, video artist and journalist
 Tommy Dorfman (born 1992), American actress 
 Xavier Dorfman, French rower and Olympic champion

See also 
 Dorfmann

German-language surnames
Jewish surnames